Equatorin, sperm acrosome associated is a protein that in humans is encoded by the EQTN gene.

References

Further reading 

 
 
 

Genes on human chromosome 9